Professor.Arkitekt. Jørgen Kastholm. IDD/BDA (1931–2007)

Born in Roskilde, Kastholm first trained as a smith but soon turned to furniture design. He attended the School for Interior Design in Copenhagen where he studied under Finn Juhl. At the beginning of the 1960s, working in Lebanon, he was inspired to design the Scimitar Chair. He also furnished the SAS office there.

It was while studying at the Design School that Kastholm met cabinetmaker Preben Fabricius who became his partner for a number of years. They had a common approach to furniture design, never wanting to compromise on quality. Speaking of their partnership, Kastholm commented: "We had the same basic approach, we both wanted to minimize. I had been to the United States and seen furniture by Eames and Mies van der Rohe and it inspired us. The simplest lasts longest. At school we had learnt that timelessness was an ideal."

In 1961, the pair set up a design studio in a Gentofte cellar without any firm arrangements with manufacturers. In 1965, they exhibited at the furniture fair in Fredericia where the German furniture manufacturer Alfred Kill noticed their work. Kill had a reputation for high quality but initially Favricius and Kastholm were not keen to design furniture for factory production. Only when Kill offered them DM 2,500 a month each, with no preconditions, did they agree to work for him. They travelled to Stuttgart with their first designs for production in Kill's factory in nearby Fellbach. Their international breakthrough came at the Cologne Fair in 1966 when they exhibited a whole series of office and home furniture leading to orders from ten large furniture concerns. Their minimalistic designs, both attractive and comfortable, were usually in steel and leather. The Tulip Chair FK 6725, the Grasshopper Chair FK 87 and the Scimitar Chair are among their most successful works. The Tulip Chair FK 6725 has become famous as Meryl Streep's office chair in the film The Devil Wears Prada.

The pieces of furniture they produced during their seven-year period of cooperation from 1961 to 1968 were so distinctive that many are still produced today as classics. As a result of disagreements, the pair decided to terminate their cooperation in 1968.

Kastholm was later appointed professor at Bergische Universität in Wuppertal near Düsseldorf where he taught design from 1975 to 1996. He also designed furniture at his office in Germany as well as in his house in the mountains on the island of Majorca. He returned to Denmark shortly before he died in June 2007.

Early life and education

1931–1931      Født i Roskilde, Danmark.
1938–1946	Kostskole. Danmark.
1946–1950	Studieophold i USA.
1950–1953	Smed / Blacksmith. Danmaek.
1953–1955	Militærtjeneste ved den Kongelig Livgarde. Danmark.
1955–1958	Skolen For Boligindretning, med udmærkelse. Danmark.
1958–1959	Den Grafiske Højskole. Danmark.
1958–1959    Frits Hansen, arbejde sammen med Arne Jacobsen på Ægget. Danmark.
1959–1960	Tegnestue i Beirut, Libanon.
1960–1961	Ole Hagens Tegnestue. Danmark.
1961–1968	Tegnestue sammen med Preben Fabricius. Danmark.
1968–1968    Book on Arne Jacobsen written by Jørgen Kastholm. Denmark.
1968–1971    Co-Editor of Magazin ”Mobilia”, Denmark
1968–1971	Egen Tegnestue i Gl.holte efter bruget med Preben Fabricius i 1968. Danmark.
1971–1971	Flytter til Düsseldorf. Tyskland.  Germany.
1971–2007    Member of the German Architect Chamber and German Werkbund. Germany.
1971–1977	Egen Tegnestue. Uhlandstrasse 37, Düsseldorf. Germany.
1975–1996    Professor at the Bergische University in Wuppertal, of furniture design and product development. Germany.
1977–1979	Egen Tegnestue. Kaiser-Wilhelm-Ring 37, Oberkassel, Düsseldorf. Germany.
1979–1987	Egen Tegnestue. Beethovenstrasse, Düsseldorf. Germany.
1987–1997	Egen Tegnestue. Schanzenenstrasse 54, Düsseldorf. Germany.
1998–2007	Egen Tegnestue. Monte Sion 13, Palma de Mallorca. Spain.
1998–2002	Egen Tegnestue. Kaiser-Wilhelm-Ring 37, Oberkassel, Düsseldorf. Germany.
2003–2007	Egen Tegnestue. Ritterstrasse 2, Düsseldorf. Germany.

Architecture & Interior

1959 Ombygning og indretning af SAS launch og kontorlokaler. Libanon.
1959 Ombygning og indretning af fire paladser til Kong Saud ibn Abd al-Aziz. Saudi-Arabien.
1963 Indretning af Snedkerlauget Møbeludstilling for Poul Bachmand. Danmark.
1964 Indretning af Messeudstilling for Elley. Danmark.
1964 Indretning af typehuse i Jylling, Roskilde. Danmark.
1965 Eget Enfamiliehus for Hr. Arkitekt. Jørgen Kastholm. Vidnæsdal 18. Gammel Holte. Danmark.
1965 Design & Indretning af  kill International  Messestand på Orgateck Møbelmesse i  Köln. Tyskland.
1965 Ombygning og tilbygning for Hr. Arkitekt. Poul Eiberg. Vidnæsdal 20. Gammel Holte. Danmark.
1966 Enfamiliehus for Hr. Ib Kruse Tidligere skibsreder i A.P. Møller. Vidnæsdal 22. Gammel Holte. Danmark.
1966 Ombygning og tilbygning for Hr. John Madsen. Espens Alle 17 Buddinge, Gladsakse. Danmark.
1966 Design & Indretning af Bo-Ex stand til møbelmessen i Bella Center. Danmark.
1966 Enfamiliehus for Hr. Ing. Rye Petersen. Trørød - Vedbæk sogn. Danmark.
1966 Design & Indretning af Ivan Schleghter stand til møbelmessen i Bella Center. Danmark.
1967 Enfamiliehus på 412 m2 for Hr. P. B. Nielsen. i Holte - Søllerød sogn. Danmark.
1967 Indretning af Musikstue for Hr. & Fru. Ing. J.P. Christiansen i Holte. Danmark.
1968 Enfamiliehus for Hr. ing. Emil Dalhoff. Vidnæsdal 10. Gammel Holte. Danmark.
1968 Design & Indretning af messestand til kill International. Formes Nouvelles. Paris. Frankrig.
1968 Ombygning af Enfamiliehus i Rungstedby - Hørsholm sogn. Danmark.
1970 Sommerbolig for Hr. Jørgen Nissen. Hejsager, Halk sogn, Haderslev amt. Hejsager strand. Danmark.
1971 Ny facade og Ombygning af Skandinavisk Møbelhus, Neuer wall 59, Hamburg. Tyskland.
1971 Lejlighedskompleks for Mr. Hazzan. Paris. Frankrig.
1971 Indretning af 2 Etagers Penthouse lejlighed for Mr. Hazzan. Paris. Frankrig.
1973 Ombygning og indretning af eget hus i Ebeltoft. Overgade 21 - Kurveledet. Danmark.
1975 Sommerbolig for Hr.Poul & Gitte Lund. Sønder Alslev Sogn. Danmark.
1976 Ombygning og Indretning af stor Lejlighed for Hr. G. Wailk. Düsseldorf. Tyskland.
1982 Design & Indretning af  kill International  Messestand på Orgateck Møbelmesse i  Köln. Tyskland.
1983 Design & Indretning af Wittmann  Messestand på Orgateck Møbelmesse i  Köln. Tyskland.
1984 Design & Indretning af ny møbel udstillingsbygning for Kusch & co. Gundringhausen 5. 59969 Hallenberg. Tyskland.
1984 Vægkunst for Kusch & co's nye Møbel udstillingsbygning. Gundringhausen 5. 59969 Hallenberg. Tyskland.
1988 Ombygning og Indretning af nyt køkken for Hr. Schulte. Tyskland.
1989 Ombygning og Indretning af stor hus for Hr. E. Schmolla. Tyskland.
1990 Design & Indretning af  Interprofil  Messestand på Orgateck Møbelmesse i  Köln. Tyskland.
1990 Ombygning og Indretning af stor hus for Hr. Dieterilgs. Muffendorf. Tyskland.
1990 Indretning af Duba messestand på Orgateck Møbelmesse i Köln. Tyskland.
1992 Indretning af Palatin Wiesloch. Kultur- und Veranstaltungszentrum. Hotel und Restaurant. Tyskland.
1992 Design & Indretning af  Idea Messestand på Orgateck Møbelmesse i  Köln. Tyskland.
1997 Design af Kirke Alter. Luttringhausen. Tyskland.
2000 Design & Indretning af Brune GMBH messestand på Orgateck Møbelmesse i Köln. Tyskland.

Exhibitions

1966  First separat Exhibition, New York, USA.
1966  Stedelijk Museum, Amsterdam.
1967  Museum of Modern Art, New York, USA.
1967  Musee d`Art Moderne, Louvre, Paris, France.
1967  Museo de Arte, Portugal.
1967  Ringling Museum of Art, Florida, USA.
1968  Separat Exhibition, Brussels. Belgium.
1968  Separat Exhibition, Stockholm, Sweden.
1969  Separat Exhibition, Copenhagen, Denmark.
1969  Separat Exhibition, Nobilier National, Paris, France.
1975  Design Center, Stuttgart. Germany.
1973  Grand Prix, Museo de Arte, Brazil.
1977  Design Center, Stuttgart. Germany.
1978  Design Center, Stuttgart. Germany.
1979  Haus Industriform, Essen, Germany.
1979  Museum of Modern Art, London, UK.
1979  Design Center, Stuttgart. Germany.

Permanent Exhibition

Museum of Modern Art, New York, USA
Musee d`Art Moderne, Louvre, Paris.
Museum of Modern Art, Barcelona. Spain.
Ringling Museum, Florida, USA.
Museo de Art, Brasilien.
Design Center, Stuttgart. Germany.
Haus Industriform, Essen, Germany.
Neue sammlung, München, Germany.
Bayer, Staatsgemäldesammlung, München, Germany.
Kunstindustrimuseum, Berlin, Germany.
Kunstmuseum, Düsseldorf. Germany.
World Import Mart Museum, Japan.
History + Folkways Museum, Japan
Museum für Angewandte Kunstgeschichte, Köln. Germany.

Movies where his furniture appears

1965 Pigen og millionæren. Sofa. Bo 565. Bo-Ex. Furniture ApS.
1967 Captain Scarlet and the Mysterons. Scimiter Chair. Bo-Ex. Furniture ApS.
1975 Rollerball. Scimiter Chair. Bo-Ex. Furniture ApS.
1998 Who Am I. The Tulip Chair. FK 6725. Walter Knoll.
2006 The Devil Wears Prada. The Tulip Chair. FK 6725. Walter Knoll.
2009 Old Dogs. The Grasshopper Lounger Chair. FK 87. Lange Production.
2009 The International. The Tulip Chair. FK6725. Walter Knoll.
2009 Happy Endings. Coffee table. Bo 551. Bo-Ex Furniture ApS.
2010 Up In The Air. The Airport Bench "Terminal" 7100 stands in 120 Airports worldwide. Kusch + co.
2010 The Ghost Writer. The Tulip Chair. FK 6725. Walter Knoll.
2011 Fair Game. Lufthavns Bænken Terminal 7100. Kusch + co.
2012 Danish X-factor. X-Chair. Lange Production.
2014 The Most Wanted Man. The Tulip Chair. FK 6725. Walter Knoll.

Awards
1958 Award in a furniture competition 2. Price
1962 International Competition 1. Price
1963 International Competition 1. Price
1964 International Competition 2. Price
1964 Snedkerlaugets møbel pris. Denmark.
1965 International Competition 1. Price
1965 Snedkerlaugets møbel pris. Denmark
1968 Illum Award. København, Denmark
1969 The Ringling Museum Award, Florida, USA.
1969 Ersten Bundespreis, Gute Form. For FK 7625. Berlin. Germany.
1971 Bog om Arne Jacobsen, Denmark.
1972 Design Center Stuttgart Award, Germany.
1972 the Giid Industrial Form Award, Hannover, Germany.
1972 Design Center Stuttgart Award, Germany.
1972 IF Gute Industrieform Award. Germany.
1973 Design Center Stuttgart Award, Germany.
1973 Grand Prix Award, Museo de Arte, Brazil.
1974 Design Center Stuttgart Award, Germany.
1974 IF Gute Industrieform Award. Germany.
1975 Design Center Stuttgart Award, Germany.
1976 Design Center Stuttgart Award, Germany.
1976 Professor at Wuppertal University, Furniture & Design. Germany.
1977 Design Center Stuttgart Award, Germany.
1978 Design Center Stuttgart Award, Germany.
1979 Design Center Stuttgart Award, Germany.
1979 Werkbund Award, Düsseldorf. Germany.
1979 Presidential Award, Royal Society of Art for Design & Management, London, UK
1979 Who's Who in Technology. Germany.
1980 Design Center Stuttgart Award, Germany.
1981 Design Center Stuttgart Award, Germany.
1981 The World Edition of the international register of profiles at Cambridge, England
1982 Werkbund Award, Düsseldorf. Germany.
1982 Design Center Stuttgart Award, Germany.
1983 Design Center Stuttgart Award, Germany.
1983 Who's Who in The World.
1983 Bundespreis, Gute Form. Germany.
1984 Design Center Stuttgart Award, Germany.
1985 Design Center Stuttgart Award, Germany.
1985 Ersten Bundespreis, Gute Form. Germany.
1986 Design Center Stuttgart Award, Germany.
1986 IF Gute Industrieform Award. Hannover, Germany.
1987 Design Center Stuttgart Award, Germany.
1988 Design Center Stuttgart Award, Germany.
1991 Eimu Award, Milano, Italy.
1992 International Furniture Design Competition.  25th Anniversary mobiia. Japan.
1992 IF Gute Industrieform Award. Germany.
1993 AFI, American Furniture International, USA
1995 Red dot Design Award.
1995 IF Gute Industrieform Award. Hannover, Germany.
1996 IF Gute Industrieform Award. Hannover, Germany.
1997 Design Zentrum NRW Award, Essen, Germany.
1997 Red dot Design Award. For Bænken Terminal 7014/5, Germany.
1997 Red dot Design Award. For Kontorstolen Officio 8815/3, Germany.
1997 Red dot Design Award. For Kontorstolen Officio 8818/3, Germany.
1997 Red dot Design Award. For konferencestol officio 8820/3, Germany.
1997 Red dot Design Award. For freischwinger officio 8830/3, Germany.
1998 IF Gute Industrieform Award. Hannover, Germany.
2001 Best selection office design Award. For Tulip Chair. FK 6725. Germany.
2001 Design Zentrum NRW Award, Essen, Germany.
2003 Scinitar Chair get Nominated for Classic chair of the year award. Denmark
2005 Red dot Design Award. For Tulip Chair. FK 6725. Germany.
2006 IF Product Design Award. For Tulip Chair. FK 6725. Germany.
2006 Porsche Design Award. Los Angeles. For FK 87 Grasshopper hair.

Patented

1974 United States Patent. 3,814,369
Tiltable swivel chair. ( http://ip.com/pat/US3814369 )

See also
Danish modern
Danish design

References

1931 births
2007 deaths
Danish furniture designers
People from Roskilde
Danish modern
Academic staff of the University of Wuppertal